Roy Kenneth Turk (September 20, 1892 – November 30, 1934) was an American songwriter and lyricist, he frequently collaborated with composer Fred E. Ahlert – their popular 1929 song "Mean to Me" has become a jazz standard. In 1926 collaborated with Lou Handman on his best known song the 1927 hit song Are You Lonesome Tonight?  made famous by acts like Elvis Presley. He worked with many other composers, including for film lyrics. Turk was elected to the Songwriters Hall of Fame in 1970.

Overview
Among his compositions (with music by Fred Ahlert unless otherwise noted):
 1923 - "My Sweetie Went Away" (music by Lou Handman)
 1927 - "Are You Lonesome Tonight?" (music by Lou Handman) popularized in 1960 by Elvis Presley
 1928 - "I'll Get By (as Long as I Have You)"
 1928 - "Mean to Me"
 1931 - "I Don't Know Why (I Just Do)"
 1931 - "Walkin' My Baby Back Home"
 1931 - "Where the Blue of the Night (Meets the Gold of the Day)" for Bing Crosby
 1932 - "Love, You Funny Thing!"

He also worked with composers such as Harry Akst, George W. Meyer, Charles Tobias, Arthur Johnston, Maceo Pinkard, and J. Russell Robinson.

References
 The ASCAP Biographical Dictionary, Third edition, American Society of Composers, Authors and Publishers, New York (1966)
 ASCAP Biographical Dictionary, Fourth edition, compiled for the American Society of Composers, Authors and Publishers, by Jaques Cattell Press, R.R. Bowker, New York (1980)
 The Complete Encyclopedia of Popular Music and Jazz, 1900–1950, Three volumes, by Roger D. Kinkle, Arlington House Publishers, New Rochelle, New York (1974)
 Songwriters. A biographical dictionary with discographies, by Nigel Harrison, McFarland & Co., Jefferson, North Carolina (1998)
 Sweet and Lowdown. America's popular songwriters, by Warren Craig, Scarecrow Press, Metuchen, New Jersey (1978), Biographies appear in the 'After Tin Pan Alley' section, beginning on page 91
 American Popular Songs. From the Revolutionary War to the present,'' edited by David Ewen, Random House, New York (1966)

External links

 Biography of Roy Turk at the Songwriters Hall of Fame
 Roy Turk recordings at the Discography of American Historical Recordings.

Jewish American songwriters
American lyricists
Songwriters from New York (state)
1892 births
1934 deaths
20th-century American musicians
20th-century American Jews